Leslie Tripathy is an Indian actress who first appeared in Odia music videos and film then in Bollywood. In 2014, Tripathy debuted in the Hindi film industry with W, directed by Tarun Madan Chopra.

Early life and background 
Tripathy is the first child of  Dr. Sailendra Narayan Tripathy, a professor in English and Ashoka Tripathy, a teacher in English literature. Tripathy has a younger brother, Shakespeare King, who is a model turned actor. She studied journalism from Asian College of Journalism, Chennai. She has written articles and has campaigned in for women's rights. Before entering into the Bollywood industry, Tripathy was active in the Odia film industry, including videos and some films.

In 2008, Tripathy sought police protection from Raja Acharya who was stalking her.  It was alleged that Biranchi Das also intervened to stop the stalker, and that he was killed as a result.

Career 
Tripathy started her Bollywood career with the 2014 film W, playing the character of Roohi Malik, a rape victim. She appeared in her first Telugu debut movie Chusinodiki Chusinantha, starring with Sivaji.

Leslie was invited to speak as a ILC Power Brand Speaker on "Countering the attack of Cyberspace trolling, body shaming, stalking, rape & death threat" at the prestigious Satya Brahma founded India Leadership Conclave in Mumbai on 4 August 2017 at Hotel Sahara Star.

Filmography

References

External links
 
 
 Leslie Tripathy at OllywoodMovie.com

Living people
People from Kendrapara district
Actresses from Odisha
Female models from Odisha
Indian film actresses
Actresses in Odia cinema
Actresses in Hindi cinema
Actresses in Telugu cinema
Actresses in Tamil cinema
21st-century Indian actresses
Year of birth missing (living people)